Phillips was an American racing car constructor. Phillips cars competed in seven FIA World Championship races - the - Indianapolis 500.

World Championship Indianapolis 500 results

References

Formula One constructors (Indianapolis only)
American racecar constructors